MSP often refers to:
 Managed service provider, a business model for providing information-technology services, outsourcing IT services
 Minneapolis–Saint Paul, the twin cities of Minneapolis and St. Paul and the surrounding area — the most populated area in Minnesota, U.S.
 Minneapolis–Saint Paul International Airport, in Hennepin County, Minnesota, U.S. (IATA airport code MSP)

MSP may also refer to:

Businesses and organizations
 LoanSphere MSP, a mortgage servicing platform application provided by Black Knight Financial Services
 Matchstick Productions, a company producing videos of extreme sports, especially skiing
 Mathematical Sciences Publishers, a scientific publisher based in Berkeley, California
 Men's Studies Press, an academic publisher registered in Harriman, Tennessee
 Moscow Finnish School (Moskovan suomalainen peruskoulu)
 Movimento Sviluppo e Pace, an Italian NGO
 Multi-Sided Platform, an organization that enables interaction between two or more groups of agents, for example through a two-sided market

Government and politics

Police forces
 Malabar Special Police, a paramilitary unit of the State Police of Kerala, India
 Maine State Police, state police agency for the U.S. state of Maine
 Maryland State Police, state police agency for the U.S. state of Maryland
 Massachusetts State Police, state police agency for the U.S. state of Massachusetts
 Michigan State Police, state police agency for the U.S. state of Michigan
 Minnesota State Patrol, state police agency for the U.S. state of Minnesota

Political parties
 Movement of Society for Peace (French: Mouvement de la société pour la paix, Arabic: Harakat Moudjtamaa As-Silm حركة مجتمع السلم, formerly called Hamas حماس), an Algerian political party
 National Salvation Party (Milli Selamet Partisi), Islamist political party in Turkey
Social Patriot Movement (Spanish: Movimiento Social Patriota), Chilean fascist organization.

Prisons
 Maine State Prison, a former prison in Thomaston, Maine
 Michigan State Prison, a former prison in Jackson, Michigan
 Mississippi State Penitentiary, in Parchman, Mississippi
 Missouri State Penitentiary, a former prison in Jefferson City, Missouri
 Montana State Prison, in Deer Lodge, Montana

Other uses in government and politics
 Main-Spessart, code used on German vehicle registration plates
 Medical Services Plan of British Columbia, government-administered single-payer health insurance scheme in the Canadian province of British Columbia
 Medicare Savings Program
 Member of the Scottish Parliament
 Ministerio de Salud Pública, Uruguayan ministry of public health

Train stations
 Marina South Pier MRT station, a MRT station in Singapore (MRT station abbreviation MSP)
 Midway station (Minnesota), a former train station in St. Paul, Minnesota, United States

Science and technology

Biology, ecology, and medicine
 Major sperm protein, the most abundant protein in nematode sperm
 Marine spatial planning, a process of making decisions about sustainable use of marine resources
 Merozoite surface protein, used in malaria research
 Methylation-specific PCR, a method for detecting methylated DNA sequence
 Macrophage-stimulating protein

Computing and information technology
 Max/MSP, max signal processing
 Message Send Protocol, an application-layer computing protocol used to send a short message between networking nodes on a computer network
 Message Submission Program or smmsp in Sendmail e-mail systems
 Microsoft Installer Patch Files, files downloaded from updating applications installed with Microsoft Installer and which have the .msp file extension
 Microsoft Points, the currency used on the Xbox Live and Zune marketplaces
 Microsoft Project, a project-management software program developed and sold by Microsoft
 Microsoft Student Partners, an organization of university students interested in careers in technology and showing a willingness to help others learn about Microsoft technology
 Microsoft Surface Pro
 Minimum spanning tree, a graph theory problem
 MSP (file format), a pre-bmp picture format readable in the oldest versions of Microsoft Paint
 TI MSP430, a mixed-signal microcontroller family from Texas Instruments

Other uses in science and technology
 Mechanically separated poultry, a paste-like meat product
 Millisecond pulsar, in astronomy, a pulsar with a rotational period in the range of 1-10 milliseconds
 Micro-spectrophotometer, an instrument used to measure the UV, visible, and near-infrared spectra of microscopic objects
 Monosodium phosphate, a chemical compound of sodium with a phosphate counterion
 MSP Groza silent pistol, a double-barreled firearm designed in the Soviet Union in 1972

Other uses
 Manic Street Preachers, Welsh rock band formed in 1986
 Meadowbrook State Parkway, in New York
 Minimum Support Price, regulated agriculture commodity price in India 
 Maastricht Science Programme, Liberal Arts & Sciences programme at Maastricht University
 MovieStarPlanet, online video game